Joseph Harrington may refer to:

Joey Harrington (born 1978), American football player
J. J. Harrington (Joseph Julian Harrington, 1919–2008), North Carolina politician
Joe Harrington (basketball) (born 1945), basketball coach
Joe Harrington (baseball) (1869–1933), baseball player
Joe Harrington (broadcaster), Irish radio presenter
Joseph Ryan Harrington (born 1999), American actor and dancer